Don Shelton (1928 – October 2, 2011) was an American football player and coach. He served as the head football coach at Murray State University from 1960 to 1966, compiling a record of 26–41–3. Prior to that, he had an impressive run as the head coach at Henderson City High School in Henderson, Kentucky.

Shelton was a four-year letter winner at the University of Louisville from 1946 to 1949.

Head coaching record

College

References

1928 births
2011 deaths
Louisville Cardinals football players
Murray State Racers football coaches
High school football coaches in Kentucky